Valeria Ciangottini (born 6 August 1945) is an Italian film-, television-, and stage-actress.

Life and career
Born in Rome, at fourteen years old Ciangottini was chosen by Federico Fellini, after he noticed her at the exit of the school, for the role of Paola in La Dolce Vita (1960). From then she started a successful acting career, being usually cast in the stereotypical role of young, pure, and tender girls. She is also active on television, in which she played main roles in several TV-movies and -series, and she hosted several programs for children. Over the years Ciangottini has essentially focused her career on theater, in particular on comedy plays. She is married to journalist Fabrizio Ricci.

Selected filmography
 Béatrice ou la servante folle (1959, film corto)
 La Dolce Vita (1960)
 La giornata balorda (1960) 
 Don Camillo monsignore... ma non troppo (1961)
 Cronaca familiare (1962) 
 I Giacobini (1962, Serie televisive)
 Le vice et la vertu (1963)
 Giuseppe Verdi (1963, Serie televisive)
 Mastro Don Gesualdo (1964, Serie televisive)
 Il treno del sabato (1964)
 L'amour à la chaîne (1965)
 Idoli controluce (1965)
 Coplan FX 18 casse tout (1965)
 Per qualche dollaro in meno (1966)
 Una questione privata (1966)
 Eine Handvoll Helden (1967)
 The Two Orphans (1965) 
 Caroline chérie (1968)
 Omicidio per vocazione (1968)
 Deadly Inheritance (1968) 
 Darling Caroline (1968)
 La legion d'onore (1970, Film TV)
 Fegefeuer (1971)
 La pietra di luna (1972, Serie televisive)
 Il commissario De Vincenzi (1974, Serie televisive)
 Il pane altrui (1974, Film TV)
 Anna Karenina (1974, Serie televisive)
 Contronatura (1976)
 La regia è finita (1977)
 D'improvviso al terzo piano (1977)
 Racconti di fantascienza (1979, Serie televisive)
 Luigi Ganna detective (1979, Serie televisive)
 Il matto (1979)
 Orient-Express (1979, Serie televisive)
 L'ultimo spettacolo di Nora Helmer (1980, Film TV)
 L'assedio (1980, Serie televisive)
 Il fascino dell'insolito (1982, Serie televisive)
 Il passo falso (1983, Film TV)
 In punta di piedi (1984)
 Murder of a Moderate Man (1985, Serie televisive)
 L'estate sta finendo (1987)
 Appointment in Liverpool (1988)
 Colletti bianchi (1988, Serie televisive)
 Una storia importante (1988)
 Errore fatale (1992, Film TV)
 Il maresciallo Rocca (1988, Serie televisive)
 I ragazzi del muretto (1988, Serie televisive)
 Le madri (1988, Film TV)
 Un posto tranquillo (2003, Film TV)
 Part Time (2004, Film TV )
 Amanti e segreti (2004, Serie televisive)
 Famiglia Campione (2004, Film corto)
 Amanti e segreti 2 (2005, Serie televisive)
 L'enigma Tewanna Ray (2006, Film TV)
 E poi c'è Filippo (2006, Serie televisive)
 Un passo dal cielo (2015, Serie televisive)
 Cronaca di una passione (2016)

References

External links

 

1945 births
Living people
Italian film actresses
Italian television actresses
Italian stage actresses
Actresses from Rome